Turbo moluccensis is a species of sea snail, a marine gastropod mollusk in the family Turbinidae, the turban snails.

Notes
Additional information regarding this species:
 Taxonomic status: Some authors place the name in the subgenus Turbo (Marmarostoma)

Description
The size of the shell attains 54 mm. The umbilicate shell has a globose-conoid shape. Its color pattern is green, rufous marbled. The whorls are rounded. The upper whorls are reddish, spirally lirate, the line unequal, slightly elevated, separated by narrow obsoletely crenulated interstices. The aperture is  subcircular. The lip is within green-margined and obsoletely crenulated.

Distribution
This marine species is found off Indonesia and Papua New Guinea.

References

External links
 To Encyclopedia of Life
 To World Register of Marine Species

moluccensis
Gastropods described in 1846